"Feel Me Flow" is a 1995 single by hip hop group Naughty by Nature from their fourth album Poverty's Paradise.  The song was the most successful single from the album, peaking at number 3 on Hot Rap Singles in mid-June and at number 17 on the Billboard Hot 100 in mid-July.  The sole rapper on the song is Treach. The accompanying music video shows Treach near a pool and the ocean in the midst of a heat wave, and also shows clips of the winter and people snowboarding. The song was later featured in the 2002 film 8 Mile.

Track listing
 CD single
 "Feel Me Flow" (Original Mix)
 "Hang Out and Hustle" (Original Mix)
 "Feel Me Flow" (E-A-Ski Remix)
 "Feel Me Flow" (Original Instrumental)
 "Hang Out and Hustle" (Original Instrumental)

Charts

Weekly charts

Year-end charts

References

1995 singles
Naughty by Nature songs
Songs written by Treach
1995 songs
Tommy Boy Records singles
Songs written by KayGee
Songs written by Vin Rock
Song recordings produced by Naughty by Nature